Sigmund Mifsud is a Trumpeter, Musical Director, Arranger and Concert Producer from Malta.

Education and early years
Sigmund Mifsud began his musical education playing the trumpet with the Sliema Band Club at age 11. He continued his study of music theory and orchestration with Mro. Anthony Chircop at the Johann Strauss School of Music in Valletta.

He studied harmony and counterpoint for three years with Maltese composer Mro. Carmelo Pace. At age 16 he collaborated with Mro. Paul Borg in practical sessions on trumpet playing, and later continued to work on advanced harmony and orchestration.

He studied conducting under the guidance of Mro Brian Schembri.

Musical career
Trumpeter
Sigmund Mifsud is a full-time member of the Malta Philharmonic Orchestra[1].
 
His career as performer includes performing as a session musician with various orchestras in musical production,[2] television appearances, and solo recitals. Sigmund also performed as a lead trumpeter with the Johann Strauss School of Music Big Band in three editions of the Malta Jazz Festival. He is the founder of the Sliema Youth Band.

Some selected solo performances with orchestra are: in 2010 the Henri Tomasi Trumpet Concerto in B flat performed with a private orchestra, solo parts for Trumpet from Gershwin's Concerto in F for Trumpet and Piano as well as the Symphonic Dances from Westside Story during the Malta Arts Festival Opening Concert under the baton of Mro. Wayne Marshall; in 2008 the Trumpet Concerto in E flat major from Haydn's Series of Baroque Concerts also with a private orchestra; and in 2006 Shostakovich Concerto in C minor for Piano, Trumpet, and String Orchestra during the Centenary Concert under the baton of Mro. Brian Schembri

Musical Director & Arranger
Sigmund's aim to deliver various music concepts to a diverse audience led him to start experimenting with fusion of classical and pop music, first with the Kenya Fund Raising Concerts, where he amalgamated a string orchestra with a wind band.

In 2004, Sigmund produced the first edition of the National Orchestra goes Pop but it was in the second edition in 2005 where he had been trusted with the role of musical director of the National Orchestra.[3]  This proved to be a successful formula and continued in the following two editions of the concert in 2006 and 2007.  Arrangements and any adaptations of musical compositions for the national philharmonic orchestra had Sigmund's signature.

In his career he has prepared arrangements for philharmonic orchestra, big band, combo band and light orchestra and for different styles of music ranging from pop, rock, folk and swing.See Big Band Concert

Sigmund also developed music arrangements and was appointed music consultant for the non-classical scores in the following two performances:
	
 Joseph Calleja, Dionne Warwick & Riccardo Cocciante - Conductor: Paul Bateman (29/07/2010)
 Joseph Calleja & Michael Bolton- Conductor: Paul Bateman (19/07/2009)

Sigmund's latest work was highlighted during the two editions of Rockestra, a concert unique in its concept for Malta, not only the National Philharmonic Orchestra engaged in playing rock music but the audience was standing creating a more of a show atmosphere. Rockestra is organised under the patronage of the President of Malta in aid of the Malta Community Chest Fund.

Concert Producer
Sigmund's experience in the music industry has also developed in an entrepreneurial manner.  His first concert production was the first edition of the National Orchestra goes Pop in 2004; and the three editions that followed in 2005, 2006[2] and 2007.  He co-produced the Manoel Theatre Swing Concert, Sigmund in a Classical Mood – Trumpet Recital and the 2008 Earth Garden Arts & Music Festival Concert.

In 2010, he was producer for the Hilton Swings Concert and also the Movie Spectacular.  Another milestone was achieved in the production of the two editions of Rockestra.

References

^ Members of the Orchestra, Malta Philharmonic Orchestra. Retrieved 9 July 2009.
^ a b The Malta Council for Culture and The Arts (7 October 2006). "The National Orchestra Goes Pop with Vodafone at the Old Opera House". Press release. http://www.maltaculture.com/page.asp?n=pressnewsdetails&i=7857&l=1. Retrieved 1 April 2009.
^ "Pop Maestro at the Opera House". MaltaToday. 2006-07-30. http://www.maltatoday.com.mt/2006/07/30/tw/index.html. 
Pjazza (programme)

People from Valletta
Maltese musicians
Living people
Year of birth missing (living people)